The Cup Bearers is an album by American trumpeter Blue Mitchell recorded in 1962 and released on the Riverside label.

Mitchell's group is the Horace Silver Quintet with Cedar Walton on piano in place of Silver.

Reception

The Allmusic review by Scott Yanow awarded the album 4 stars and stated "The music swings hard, mostly avoids sounding like a Horace Silver group, and has particularly strong solos... excellent hard bop".

Track listing
 "Turquoise" (Cedar Walton) - 5:03 
 "Why Do I Love You?" (Oscar Hammerstein II, Jerome Kern) - 5:28 
 "Dingbat Blues" (Charles Davis) - 5:41 
 "Capers" (Tom McIntosh) - 6:04 
 "The Cup Bearers" (McIntosh) - 6:15 
 "How Deep Is the Ocean?" (Irving Berlin) - 6:43 
 "Tiger Lily" (Thad Jones) - 8:31 
Recorded at Plaza Sound Studios in New York City on August 28 & 30, 1962

Personnel
Blue Mitchell - trumpet
Junior Cook - tenor saxophone
Cedar Walton - piano
Gene Taylor - bass
Roy Brooks - drums

References

Riverside Records albums
Blue Mitchell albums
1962 albums
Albums produced by Orrin Keepnews